Joe Dingwall (born 2 October 1988) is a former professional footballer who played for Scottish Football League club East Stirlingshire, as a left back. Joe retired from football to pursue an acting career,  where notable appearances include Burniston and Trainspotting 2.

Career
Born in Edinburgh, Dingwall began his youth career with Scottish Premier League club Hibernian, before signing with Raith Rovers in August 2006. Originally signed for the youth team Dingwall exceeded expectations and was promoted to the first team, where he was often asked to form a defensive partnership with Marvin Andrews. It was rumoured at the time that Dingwall was brought into the squad after proving his aerial prowess, during a training session where he out-headered the much more physically dominant Andrews. Ironically Andrews had bet Dingwall his luxury car that he would not win one header in the training session, Dingwall is still waiting for the car.

After making 17 league appearances for Raith Rovers in a two-year spell, he was released and signed for Arbroath. Dingwall struggled to find opportunities during his six-month spell at the club, managing only one league cup appearance.  Looking for more playing time, Dingwall signed for Berwick Rangers in January 2009, where unfortunately was unable to make an appearance being released in June 2009.  After a spell away from the football league, Dingwall signed for East Stirlingshire in July 2011.

In his short time at East Stirlingshire, Dingwall has become a cult favourite of the shire fans due to his tendency to sport an outrageous moustache during games. He only strengthened his cult status after his 25-yard cross found the back of the net via the post against Berwick Rangers on 25 February, with East Stirlingshire running out 2–0 victors. The goal was Dingwall's first-ever in the Football League and the grand stature of such an event prompted the defender to share his memory with fellow footballer and Scotland international David Goodwillie, with whom he made his début with for Raith back in 2007.

References

1988 births
Living people
Scottish footballers
East Stirlingshire F.C. players
Scottish Football League players
Hibernian F.C. players
Raith Rovers F.C. players
Arbroath F.C. players
Berwick Rangers F.C. players
Footballers from Edinburgh
Association football fullbacks